Staraya Square ( Staraya Ploshchad’), literally "Old Square", connects Ilyinka Street with Varvarka Gates Square in central Kitai-gorod area of Moscow, Russia. It is not a square in a true sense, but a street, normally closed to regular city traffic. The historical building located at 4 Staraya Square, was the headquarters of the Central Committee of the Communist Party of the Soviet Union, thus Staraya Square became a symbol for the Party apparatus. Now the building is the headquarters of Presidential Administration of Russia, retaining its symbolic value. It is one of the Central Squares of Moscow forming an arc around Moscow Kremlin and Kitai-gorod.

History

Staraya Square emerged as the city street inside the Kitai-gorod fortress wall; a parallel street outside the wall is named Kitaisky Lane (as there are no buildings in this lane, the name has fallen out of usage). The wall was built in 1530s, and demolished in 1934. 

Throughout the 19th century, Staraya Square and northbound Novaya Square frequently interchanged their names, confusing Muscovites and visitors; modern usage settled down in early 20th century. In 1899, the city closed down the flea markets around the fortress wall. Before the outbreak of World War I, the Moscow Merchant Society had rebuilt Staraya Square with a chain of grand office buildings such as an Art Nouveau example, Boyarsky Dvor (by Fyodor Schechtel), and neoclassical 4, Staraya Square (by Vladimir Sherwood Jr.). Since 1918, they have been occupied by Soviet and presently Russian federal institutions.

Public transportation access
 Moscow Metro: Kitai-gorod

References
 History prior to 1947: Russian: П.В.Сытин, "Из истории московских улиц", М, 1948, pp. 35–41
 Present-day naming convention: City of Moscow decree N.958, 25.10.1994 text in Russian
 Architectural landmarks on Central Squares: Bilingual: "Monuments of architecture of Moscow. Kremlin, Kitai-gorod and Central Squares", Moscow, Iskusstvo, 1977

Squares in Moscow